Uncle Mover, formerly known as Mike The Mover (born Michael Patrick Shanks, March 17, 1953), is an American perennial candidate and business owner from Washington State. Shanks legally changed his name to Mike the Mover in 1990 to help promote his furniture moving business.

Politics 
According to Mover, he has run for public office more than 17 times but has never been elected.

Though originally motivated to run for office in order to draw attention to Washington's complex regulations for movers, Mover's more recent campaigns have been a marketing tactic to promote his business. In 2004 he estimated $150,000 of his company's annual revenue came from name familiarity generated by his ballot appearances. Never endorsed by a political party, he has sought office as both a Democrat and a Republican. In the 2014 election for U.S. Congress from Washington's 1st congressional district, Mover, a Civil War enthusiast, ran as a candidate of the "National Union Party" (under Washington elections law, candidates can declare themselves a member of any party, whether the party exists or not). Changing his name again to Uncle Mover, Mover filed to run for U.S. Senate in 2016.

Personal life 
Mike the Mover grew up as one of twelve children born to Richard and Patricia Shanks. His father was the former Mayor of Lake City prior to it becoming part of Seattle in the 1950s.

Mover resides in Snohomish County near Lynnwood, Washington.

In 1977, Mover started moving professionally. Unable to receive a state permit, he was charged 89 times with gross misdemeanors and was convicted of in two of these cases for operating an illegal moving business.

See also
Goodspaceguy
Stan Lippmann
Richard Pope

References

1953 births
Living people
People from Snohomish County, Washington
Reform Party of the United States of America politicians
Washington (state) Democrats
Washington (state) Republicans